"Poison Pen" is a song by Australian rock group Hoodoo Gurus. It was written by Dave Faulkner. and released in September 1986 as the fourth and final single from the group's second studio album, Mars Needs Guitars!. The song peaked at number 76 on the Australian charts.

In June 2000, Dave Faulkner said "The Gurus' first manager, Stuart Coupe, wrongly thought that 'Poison Pen' was written about him, probably because of his notoriety as a Rock Journalist (often an oxymoron) and he had also been recently replaced... The song was about the fallout from a relationship that had turned bitter (with no 'sweet') attached)".

Track listing
 7" version (BTS 1793)
 "Poison Pen" (Dave Faulkner) — 4:06
 "In the Wild" (Faulkner) — 3:29 (Recorded live at Selina's Sydney 17 and 18 February 1986)
 "Teenage Head" (Cyril Jordan, Roy Loney) — 3:02 (recorded live at Selina's Sydney 17 and 18 February 1986)

Personnel
 Clyde Bramley — bass, backing vocals
 Dave Faulkner — lead vocals, guitar
 Mark Kingsmill — drums, cymbals
 Brad Shepherd — guitar, backing vocals
 Producer — Charles Fisher
 Engineer — John Bee
 Mastering — Don Bartley

Charts

References

1986 singles
Hoodoo Gurus songs
1985 songs
Songs written by Dave Faulkner (musician)